Roy Rogers Franchise Company, LLC is a chain of fast food restaurants primarily located in the Mid-Atlantic and Northeastern United States. The chain originated as the rebranding of the RoBee's House of Beef chain of Fort Wayne, Indiana, acquired by the Marriott Corporation in February 1968. However, Marriott first used the Roy Rogers Roast Beef name on conversions of the company's Junior Hot Shoppes in the Washington, D.C. area in April 1968, then the existing RoBee's stores. An aggressive nationwide franchising campaign was launched. At its peak, the chain included over 600 locations. The chain now has 40 locations in six states, either company owned or franchised.

The Roy Rogers chain was sold in 1990 to Imasco, then the parent company of Hardee's, and experienced severe decline as many locations  converted to Hardee's. In 2002, the trademark was purchased by Plamondon Companies.

Roy Rogers' menu consists primarily of hamburgers, roast beef sandwiches, fried chicken, nine side items (including french fries), and beverages.  Many locations also serve breakfast.

History

1967–1968: RoBee's and Marriott
In 1967 the Azar's Big Boy restaurant franchise started RoBee's House of Beef restaurants in Ft. Wayne, Indiana. The Marriott Corp., which had acquired Bob's Big Boy and the Big Boy trademark in 1967, acquired RoBee's in February 1968 with plans to expand nationwide. RoBee's franchises would first be offered to Big Boy franchisees to coincide with their existing Big Boy territory. At the time there were 13 RoBee's restaurants in six states.

During the acquisition, in January 1968, the competing roast beef chain Arby's sued RoBee's for trademark infringement and (other similarities that it considered) unfair competition. Because "RoBee's" sounded too much like "Arby's" the settlement required a new brand name and Marriott wanted something recognizable. Big Boy founder Bob Wian, then sitting on Marriott's board of directors, was friends with Roy Rogers' agent and suggested that the company approach Rogers about the use of his name. Already interested in associating with a chain restaurant, Rogers was in similar discussions with another company when Marriott called. Nonetheless, he accepted Marriott's offer: Rogers would receive a licensing fee for use of his name and also be paid for personal appearances at the restaurants. The restaurants would be called "Roy Rogers Roast Beef Sandwich" restaurants, and despite Arby's complaints, it retained RoBee's building design and covered wagon logo design.

Several major Big Boy franchisees accepted Marriott's offer and became Roy Rogers regional franchisees, including Abdow's, Frisch's, Elias Brothers, Marc's, and Shoney's which together covered much of the Northeastern, Midwest and Southern US. Pittsburgh franchisee Eat'n Park rejected the offer and took public offense at paying fees to Rogers. In the Pittsburgh area and elsewhere, other regional franchisees were sought who would also subfranchise to smaller operators, and by January 1969 Marriott claimed regional franchises for every state but Alaska. Roy Rogers' restaurants also opened in Canada, franchised to that nation's Big Boy franchisee, JB's of Canada.

Marriott divided the United States into 33 franchise regions and required regional franchisees open a set number of restaurants in a four-year period. Regional franchisees would pay Marriott a 2% royalty, and subfranchisees typically pay the regional franchisee 3%, who would keep the additional 1%. A restaurant required a $35,000 cash investment upfront, including $7,500 paid to Marriott. Additionally, the cost of the building and equipment, with seating for 42 persons, cost about $100,000 in 1968, excluding the cost of land. Marriott offered financing but charged an interest rate of 12% on land and 17% for the building. The prototype restaurant seated 40 to 45 persons with additional outdoor seating on an optional patio in front of the building, but actual restaurants varied, one franchisee's dining area accommodating 75 persons.

The first Roy Rogers restaurant opened up on Co- founder and Hot Shoppes manager, Henry L. Wright's property in April 1968 in the Bailey's Crossroads section of Falls Church, Virginia, on the corner of Leesburg Pike and Carlin Springs Road (5603 Leesburg Pike). Another opened at 5214 River Road, in Bethesda, Maryland. The area was selected because Marriott was headquartered in metropolitan Washington, D.C., the River Road unit located directly across the street. (Marriott executives and Marriott family members were frequent patrons of this store.) These first locations were conversions of Jr. Hot Shoppes, Marriott's existing fast food chain. In May 1968, RoBee's units began to open as Roy Rogers. Rogers made a four state tour of namesake restaurants in the Southern U.S., appearing at each location for an hour, shaking hands and handing out signed photographs. Filming for the first television commercials advertising Roy Rogers Restaurants took place in the Apple Valley, California area where Rogers lived with his family. In 1968 and 1969, Rogers and friends, Earl Bascom and Mel Marion, were filmed at various locations including the historic Las Flores Ranch in Summit Valley and the Campbell Ranch in Victorville.

Rapid growth began in 1968 and Marriott made optimistic projections. In October 1968, there were reportedly 38 units open and 65 under construction, and by December, 56 open and 39 under construction. Marriott projected 700 or more Roy Rogers restaurants in four years. By June 1969, 105 units were open with a new projection of 870 in four years. A February 1970 newspaper article reported that over 160 units were in operation. However, growth halted in 1970, when Marriott suspended Roy Rogers franchising, due to financial losses from closings of failing locations. The following year, the Texas–based regional franchise, Ram-Hart Systems, filed for Chapter 11 protection, asking to terminate leases found unprofitable, which were making the entire chain unprofitable. After franchising resumed, only 172 restaurants were open by September 1972, a quarter of the 700 stores projected four years earlier.

In 1982, Marriott bought the Gino's restaurant chain for $48.6 million. The company converted 180 of the 313 restaurants to Roy Rogers to expand in the Baltimore/Washington area.

1990: Hardee's
In 1990, Marriott sold the chain for $365 million to Imasco, the parent company of Hardee's, a Midwestern and Southern chain seeking further expansion into the Mid-Atlantic market. The remaining non-franchised Roy Rogers locations were converted into Hardee's restaurants, although many of the converted Hardee's continued to offer Roy Rogers' fried chicken. The conversion of the Roy Rogers chain caused a customer revolt and the units returned the Roy Rogers' brand. The restaurants promoted new flame-broiled hamburgers, but they were not the same as the original Roy Rogers products and later failed.

Hardee's finally sold the remaining Roy Rogers locations to McDonald's, Wendy's, and Boston Market between 1994 and 1996. This left 13 Roy Rogers franchisees, with two dozen free-standing locations, in addition to locations owned by HMSHost in travel plazas along highways in the Northeast.

Prior to the Hardee's acquisition, Roy Rogers cooked its fries in a blend of beef tallow and vegetable oil. Hardee's, which had already replaced tallow with all vegetable shortening, implemented the same procedure for Roy Rogers.

2002: Plamondon Companies
In 1997, CKE Restaurants acquired Hardee's from Imasco, but Imasco retained the Roy Rogers trademark and franchise system, finally selling Roy Rogers to Plamondon Enterprises (now Plamondon Companies) in 2002, after three years of negotiation. Roy Rogers was relaunched as Roy Rogers Franchise Company, LLC. Plamondon had already opened the first new Roy Rogers restaurant in Frederick, Maryland in 2000. At the time of the sale, there were 63 existing Roy Rogers franchises in nine states.

Plamondon Companies, which opened its first franchised Roy Rogers restaurant in 1980, took the lead among franchisees in developing products, hosting training sessions and shooting new food photography for their stores. The company is run by Jim Plamondon and Peter Plamondon Jr., the two sons of Peter Plamondon Sr., head of the restaurant division at Marriott when the Roy Rogers brand was created. Based in Frederick, Maryland, Plamondon is a privately held company.

Key dates

1968: Marriott acquires the 16 unit RoBee's roast beef chain. A trademark infringement complaint by Arby's causes rebranding as Roy Rogers restaurants.
1968: The first Roy Rogers opens at 5603 Leesburg Pike, Falls Church, Virginia.
1970: Marriott halts franchising and takes write-offs due to bad investments in failing stores.
1970s: Roy Rogers chain struggles under Marriott. Several hundred franchised and company units open, but much less than company projections.
1970s: First Long Island stores open in Greenvale (Nassau County, New York) and Commack (Suffolk County, New York).
1973: Stores in Uniondale, Island Trees, and Farmingdale (all located in Nassau County, New York) open.
1975: Long Island store opens in Shirley, New York, in Suffolk County.
1976: Roy Rogers in Fairfax, Virginia (on Little River Turnpike at the border of Alexandria, Virginia) is robbed, in a high-profile case, where five employees were herded into the restaurant's freezer and shot in the head. Four people were killed, and one survived.
1977: Roy Rogers and his Sons of the Pioneers singers, make an appearance at a Fairfax location on August 30. While performing, a 17 year old ran past the bandstand and hurled a cottage cheese pie in Rogers' face. The youth plead guilty a month later and was fined $100 for his actions.
1982: Marriott purchases the Gino's restaurant chain for $48.6 million and converts many of the restaurants to Roy Rogers.
1982: Marriott threatens to take the Riese family, a franchisee, to court when they discovered the Rieses were reserving space for Häagen Dazs and Godfather's Pizza in a property slotted for a Times Square Roy Rogers restaurant.
1989: Marriott decides to get out of the fast-food business and sell its Roy Rogers, Howard Johnson's, Bob's Big Boy and other chains to concentrate on its fast-food operations catering to captive buyers at airports and along turnpikes.
1990: A total of 648 Roy Rogers locations are in operation—primarily in the Northeast and Mid-Atlantic states.
1990: Marriott sells Roy Rogers to Hardee's, subsidiary of Imasco, for $365 million in its plan to exit the fast-food business.
1990: Hardee's converts 220 Roy Rogers locations to Hardee's.
1992: Hardee's reconverts 220 former Roy Rogers locations back to Roy Rogers.
1992: Jordan, McGrath, Case & Taylor Inc., a New York advertising agency, is hired to promote the Roy Rogers brand.
1992: Ronald R. Powell, who ran Roy Rogers from 1985 to 1987 under Marriott, becomes President of Roy Rogers and is believed to have influenced Hardee's decision in dropping its conversion strategy and restoring the chain to its original identity.
1994: Hardee's sells 84 company-owned Roy Rogers restaurants in the Philadelphia region to Boston Market for $22 million.
1995: Hardee's sells 45 company-owned Roy Rogers restaurants in the New York region to Wendy's International Inc.
1996: Hardee's sells 184 company-owned Roy Rogers restaurants in the Baltimore–Washington metropolitan area to McDonald's for $74 million.
1996: Only 13 Roy Rogers franchisees remain operating a total of about 152 units through the Northeast, including 48 units in highway travel plazas and 15 in New York City.
1997: CKE Restaurants (Carl's Jr.) acquires Hardee's from Imasco. Imasco retains Roy Rogers trademark due to a franchisee lawsuit.
1997: The Riese family, now franchisees of 18 Roy Rogers restaurants, sues CKE Restaurants and Imasco for $10 million, claiming the Roy Rogers chain has been destroyed through "a series of marketing errors of epic proportions."
1997: CKE enters into a management agreement for the six Roy Rogers restaurants currently operated by Hardee's. CKE also agrees to perform services relating to the continued franchise operations of the Roy Rogers restaurant chain for $1.5 million over three years.
2002: Imasco sells Roy Rogers trademark rights to Plamondon Enterprises, Inc. (Roy Rogers Franchise Co.).
2003: HMSHost (formerly Host Marriott Services) signs agreement to continue operating Roy Rogers in travel plazas.
2003: Roy Rogers Franchise Company unveils its "Roy Rogers Rides Again!" refranchising growth initiative.
2003: Roy Rogers Restaurants launches royrogersrestaurants.com website.
2006: Roy Rogers Restaurants rank 4th in the Franchise Times "20 to Watch in 2006."
2021: Roy Rogers created a vice president of franchise sales position and hired Gregg Koffler. The strategy is to build concentrically out of core markets in the Mid-Atlantic, like Maryland, Virginia, West Virginia, and Pennsylvania. The growth circle would slowly get bigger and include New York, the Eastern Seaboard, and states like Ohio, Tennessee, Florida, Texas, Louisiana, Mississippi, Alabama, and Georgia.
2022: Roy Rogers gets into a new partnership with One Holland Corp. restaurant group and plans to open 10 new Roy Rogers locations over the next six years in the Cincinnati metropolitan area. The new locations would be in Hamilton, Butler and Clermont counties in Southwest Ohio; Boone, Kenton, Campbell counties in Northern Kentucky; and Dearborn County in Southeast Indiana. One Holland's first location opened in Cleves, Ohio in February 2023.

Products and services

Though standard Roy Rogers locations serve food in a typical fast-food fashion, some locations (such as the locations that were formerly Jr. Hot Shoppes) and the franchises located throughout Mid-Atlantic highway rest-stops serve the food in a cafeteria-style.  An exception is the Allentown service plaza on the Pennsylvania Turnpike's Northeast Extension, which serves its customers in the typical fast-food fashion since it reopened in May 2008 (the entire service plaza had been rebuilt from its original form, which included cafeteria-style serving).

In the cafeteria-style restaurants, customers push their trays on rails past stations stocked with pre-wrapped packages of hamburgers, cheeseburgers, and roast-beef sandwiches. A feature of this chain in any of the locations is the Fixin's Bar which features numerous condiments. Due to this feature, sandwich items are delivered without any of the customary garnishes. After selecting and paying for these items, patrons can garnish them to their own taste at the Fixin's Bar with such items as ketchup, BBQ sauce, mayonnaise, horseradish sauce, lettuce, tomatoes, pickles, and onions. Numerous locations offer hand-dipped milkshakes made with Edy's Ice Cream.

Popular items on the menu are roast beef sandwiches and fried chicken, which was advertised by Roy Rogers under the "Pappy Parker" name beginning in the 1970s using a cartoon prospector (the Pappy Parker name was inherited from Marriott's original Hot Shoppes chain). Other signature items at Roy Rogers are the Gold Rush chicken sandwich (a fried chicken breast with bacon, a slice of Monterey Jack cheese, and a honey-based BBQ sauce) and the Double-R Bar Burger (a cheeseburger with ham). The side items featured at Roy Rogers are french fries, baked potatoes, mashed potatoes with gravy, and baked beans.

Locations
Roy Rogers Restaurants are located in the following seven states, along with the number of locations.

 West Virginia: 1
 Maryland: 22
 New Jersey: 2
 New York: 1
 Pennsylvania: 7
 Virginia: 7
 Ohio: 1

As of February 2023, there are 41 Roy Rogers restaurants.

See also

 List of hamburger restaurants
 List of fast-food chicken restaurants

Notes

References

External links
 Roy Rogers Restaurants

Falls Church, Virginia
Companies based in Frederick County, Maryland
Frederick, Maryland
Economy of the Northeastern United States
Regional restaurant chains in the United States
Fast-food chains of the United States
Restaurants established in 1968
Fast-food hamburger restaurants
Fast-food poultry restaurants
Fast-food franchises
1968 establishments in Virginia
Roy Rogers
1990 mergers and acquisitions
2002 mergers and acquisitions
Roast beef restaurants in the United States